Ruby Jagrut (born 1 October 1973), is an Indian natural dye artist. She paints using only natural dyes on canvas. She is the founder of Abir Charitable Trust.

Biography 
Jagrut was born in a traditional Gujarati family in the small town of Dharampur, Gujarat, near Valsad, India.

As a child, she loved painting. During her school days, she was always inclined towards art and used to make charcoal drawings.

Jagrut completed her B.A in Psychology from St. Xaviers in Ahmedabad; she then took a course in Mass Communications from Bhavan's College, Ahmedabad. Her introduction to the art form with natural dyes started at Kanoria Art Center Ahmedabad.

Career 
While working at Kanoria Center for Arts (1993–94), she attended a workshop on vegetable dyes. She learned how to extract colours from vegetables, minerals, and natural pigments and thus began her journey with natural dyes.

She had her first solo exhibition in 1999. To raise awareness and popularize the concept of using natural dyes on canvas, she conducts workshops in India and abroad for artists, dyers, weavers, students, and private design centers. She has been associated with various design schools like Pearl Academy, Sheth Chimanlal Nagindas Vidyalaya Fine Arts, National Institute of Fashion Technology (NIFT) (Gandhinagar) and an art centre from South Korea. Every year, Jagrut's initiative Abir Charitable Trust organises an exhibition called First Take, it helps the lesser-known artists to bring their works to the public eye.

References 

Living people
1973 births
Indian women artists
Indian painters